Thomas Branch ( 1738–1753) was an English author.

Thomas Branch may also refer to:
Thomas H. Branch (1857–1924), American missionary
Thomas Branch (Missouri River tributary), a stream in Missouri
Thomas Branch (Tiger Fork tributary), a stream in Missouri